Yongchun station (formerly transliterated as Yungchun Station until 2003) is a station on the Bannan line of the Taipei Metro, located in Xinyi District, Taipei, Taiwan. It opened on 30 December 2000 as part of the eastern extension to Kunyang. The station is a planned transfer for the Circular line.

Station overview
The two-level, underground station and has one island platform and five exits. It is located underneath Zhongxiao East Road.

Two of the entrances are constructed with joint development buildings - E.A.T. Fashion Building and E.A.T. International Building.

Station layout

Exits

Exit 1: Lane 423, Zhongxiao E. Rd. Sec. 5
Exit 2: Zhongxiao E. Rd. Sec. 5
Exit 3: No.466, Zhongxiao E. Rd. Sec. 5
Exit 4: Intersection of Zhongxiao E. Rd. Sec. 5 and Hulin St.
Exit 5: Intersection of Zhongxiao E. Rd. Sec. 5 and Hulin St.

Around the station
Yongchun Market
a.mart (Zhongxiao Branch)
Taipei Songshan High School of Agriculture and Industry
Taipei Municipal Song Shan High School of Commerce
Yongji Elementary School
Yonchun Elementary School (between this station and Houshanpi station)
Taipei Songshan High School (between this station and Taipei City Hall station)
Yongchun High School

References

2000 establishments in Taiwan
Railway stations opened in 2000
Bannan line stations